Yarinarayanpur is a village in Dharwad district of Karnataka, India.

Demographics
As of the 2011 Census of India there were 243 households in Yarinarayanpur and a total population of 1,248 consisting of 608 males and 640 females. There were 128 children ages 0-6.

References

Villages in Dharwad district